Blue Anchor railway station is situated in the seaside village of Blue Anchor, Somerset, England, close to the larger village of Carhampton.  It is on the West Somerset Railway, a heritage railway, and it houses the museum of the West Somerset Steam Railway Trust.

History

The station was first opened on 16 July 1874 by the Minehead Railway as Blue Anchor.  Suggestions that it was called 'Blue Anchor Excursion Platform' or 'Bradley Gate' have been shown to be incorrect. In 1874 it had only one platform, which faced the beach, but in 1904 the second track and platform were built by the Great Western Railway, which had taken over the railway in 1897.  At the same time the signal box was opened to control new gates on the level crossing which carries the Carhampton road across the line at the west end of the station. A goods yard was opened west of the level crossing in 1913.

In 1934, as part of general upgrading of the Minehead branch, the platforms and passing loop were extended. A GWR camp coach was stabled here from 1934 to 1939. A camping coach was also positioned here by the Western Region from 1952 to 1956, two coaches from 1957 to 1961 and three coaches from 1962 to 1964.

Goods traffic was withdrawn in 1963 and passenger services ceased from 4 January 1971. Camp coaches once again grace the goods yard, where they provide overnight accommodation for volunteers working on the railway.

Museum

The station buildings have been restored and the waiting room on the westbound platform was converted to a railway museum, opening in 1986 under the auspices of the West Somerset Railway Steam Trust. Staffing is provided by the Friends of Blue Anchor Railway Museum, who also undertake fundraising activities. The museum now contains around 550 items, mainly related to the Great Western Railway or other West Country lines.

Description
The station is situated on a passing loop on the single track line and has two platforms.  The one on the north side of the line and nearest the beach dates from 1874; this is where the signal box and ticket office can be found. The second platform has the museum situated in its waiting room.

Services

References

External links

 West Somerset railway - Blue Anchor Station
 Blue Anchor Railway Museum

West Somerset Railway
Heritage railway stations in Somerset
Railway stations in Great Britain opened in 1874
Railway stations in Great Britain closed in 1971
Railway stations in Great Britain opened in 1976
Former Great Western Railway stations
Museums in Somerset
Railway museums in England